Gerolamo Ventimiglia, C.R. (1644–1709) was a Roman Catholic prelate who served as Bishop of Lipari (1694–1709).

Biography
Gerolamo Ventimiglia was born in Palermo, Italy in 1644 and ordained a priest in the Congregation of Clerics Regular of the Divine Providence. On 19 July 1694, he was appointed during the papacy of Pope Innocent XII as Bishop of Lipari. On 25 July 1694, he was consecrated bishop by Galeazzo Marescotti, Cardinal-Priest of Santi Quirico e Giulitta, Prospero Bottini, Titular Archbishop of Myra, and Stefano Giuseppe Menatti, Titular Bishop of Cyrene, serving as co-consecrators. He served as Bishop of Lipari until his death on 17 December 1709.

Episcopal succession
While bishop, Ventimiglia was the principal co-consecrator of:
Asdrubale Termini, Bishop of Siracusa (1695);
Tommaso d'Aquino, Bishop of Vico Equense (1700); and
Giovanni Battista Capano, Bishop of Bitonto (1700).

References

External links and additional sources
 (for Chronology of Bishops) 
 (for Chronology of Bishops) 

17th-century Roman Catholic bishops in Sicily
18th-century Roman Catholic bishops in Sicily
Bishops appointed by Pope Innocent XII
1644 births
1709 deaths
Clergy from Palermo
Theatine bishops